Sabath may refer to:

 A. J. Sabath, American politician, former Commissioner of Labor and Workforce Development in New Jersey
 Adolph J. Sabath (1866–1952), member of the U.S. House of Representatives
 Frankie Sabath, Puerto Rican entertainer
 Sabath Mele (born 1923), American former right fielder, manager, coach and scout in Major League Baseball
 Karol Sabath (born 1963), Polish paleontologist paleoartist and biologist.

Given names
Surnames